Nerea Pérez Machado (born 11 January 1994) is a Spanish footballer who plays as a midfielder for Villarreal of the Primera División.

Club career
Growing up in Benidorm, Pérez had always desired to be a footballer. After nine years of playing at Levante, she signed for Santa Teresa, who had just gained promotion to the Primera División at that time. She would make 26 league appearances for Santa Teresa in the 2020–21 season. On 2 July 2021, she then transferred to Villarreal to become their first signing of that season.

International career
Pérez represented Spain at under-17 and under-19 level. She played in the team that finished third in the U-17 World Cup and the team that finished second in the 2012 UEFA Championship.

References

External links
Profile at La Liga 

1994 births
Living people
Spanish women's footballers
Primera División (women) players
Levante UD Femenino players
People from Benidorm
Sportspeople from the Province of Alicante
Women's association football midfielders
Footballers from the Valencian Community
Villarreal CF (women) players
Sporting Plaza de Argel players
Santa Teresa CD players
Spain women's youth international footballers